is a passenger railway station  located in the town of Daisen, Tottori Prefecture, Japan. It is operated by the West Japan Railway Company (JR West).

Lines

Station layout
The station consists of one ground-level side platform serving  single bi-directional track. The station is unattended.

History
Nakayamaguchi Station opened on November 1, 1951. With the privatization of the Japan National Railways (JNR) on April 1, 1987, the station came under the aegis of the West Japan Railway Company.

Passenger statistics
In fiscal 2018, the station was used by an average of 134 passengers daily.

Surrounding area
Daisen Town Hall Nakayama Branch Office

See also
List of railway stations in Japan

References

External links 

 Nakayamaguchi Station from JR-Odekake.net 

Railway stations in Tottori Prefecture
Stations of West Japan Railway Company
Sanin Main Line
Railway stations in Japan opened in 1951
Daisen, Tottori